Bernard Small (September 7, 1918 - May 21, 2003) was an American film producer. He was the son of Elsie (née Wilson) and Edward Small.

Selected credits
Bulldog Drummond at Bay (1947)
Bulldog Drummond Strikes Back (1947)
13 Lead Soldiers (1948)
The Challenge (1948)
The Creeper (1948)
Davy Crockett, Indian Scout (1950)
The Iroquois Trail (1950)
The Texas Rangers (1951)
Indian Uprising (1952)

External links

1918 births
2003 deaths
American film producers
American people of Jewish descent